William Frederick Johnson (1852–1934) was an Irish naturalist primarily interested in Entomology.

Biography
He was born on 20 April 1852 in Travancore, India, where he spent his youth. A genial and kindly clergyman, he published over 100 papers each on Lepidoptera, sixty or so on Hymenoptera and smaller numbers on each of ten other insect orders. His best known work is A list of the beetles of Ireland (Coleoptera) a collaboration with J N Halbert published in 1902. A graduate of Dublin University, he spent most of his life in Co Armagh, first as a teacher in Armagh town, then as Rector in Poyntzpass. Later in life he spent time in various parts of Co Down and Co Louth. The fact that he was elected a Special Life Fellow of the Royal Entomological Society of London gives some measure of the esteem in which he was held. Johnson was a careful and assiduous worker, careful to send dubiously identified specimens to others. His Ichneumonidae were sent to the Swede Per Abraham Roman, for instance. Richard Strauss once said of himself "I am not a composer of the first rate, but I am a splendid composer of the second". The same may said of William Johnson. He died at Rostrevor on 28 March 1934.

Johnson's Coleoptera Collection is in the Ulster Museum, Belfast. The Hymenoptera, Lepidoptera and other orders are in the National Museum of Ireland, Dublin. Unfortunately none of his correspondence has survived.

Works
Johnson, W.F. & Halbert, J.N. (1902). A list of the beetles of Ireland. Proc. R. Ir. Acad.6(3): 535-827.
Johnson, W.F. & Halbert, J.N. (1912). Clare Island Survey. 28. Terrestrial Coleoptera. Proc. R. Ir. Acad. 31: 1-24

References

Further reading
Walker, James John, 1934 Obituary: The Rev. William Frederick Johnson, M.A., F.R.E.S.. Entomologist's Monthly Magazine 70: 164-165

1852 births
1934 deaths
Irish entomologists
Hymenopterists
Alumni of Trinity College Dublin
Fellows of the Royal Entomological Society